James Chambers OM (born 30 July 1944), known professionally as Jimmy Cliff, is a Jamaican ska, rocksteady, reggae and soul musician, multi-instrumentalist, singer, and actor. He is the only living reggae musician to hold the Order of Merit, the highest honour that can be granted by the Jamaican government for achievements in the arts and sciences. 

Cliff is best known among mainstream audiences for songs such as "Many Rivers to Cross", "You Can Get It If You Really Want", "The Harder They Come", "Reggae Night", and "Hakuna Matata", and his covers of Cat Stevens's "Wild World" and Johnny Nash's "I Can See Clearly Now" from the film Cool Runnings. He starred in the film The Harder They Come, which helped popularize reggae around the world, and Club Paradise. Cliff was one of five performers inducted into the Rock and Roll Hall of Fame in 2010.

Early life and education
Jimmy Cliff was born James Chambers on 30 July 1944 in Saint James, Colony of Jamaica. He began writing songs while still at primary school in St. James, listening to a neighbour's sound system. When Chambers was 14, his father took him to Kingston, where he would take up the stage name Jimmy Cliff.

Career

1960s and 1970s
Cliff sought out many producers while still going to school, trying to get his songs recorded without success. He also entered talent contests. "One night I was walking past a record store and restaurant as they were closing, pushed myself in and convinced one of them, Leslie Kong, to go into the recording business, starting with me," he writes in his own website biography. After two singles that failed to make much impression, his career took off when "Hurricane Hattie" became a hit while he was aged 14. It was produced by Kong, with whom Cliff remained until Kong's death from a heart attack in 1971.

Cliff's later local hit singles included "King of Kings", "Dearest Beverley", "Miss Jamaica", and "Pride and Passion". In 1964, Cliff was chosen as one of Jamaica's representatives at the World's Fair in New York; and in the same year Cliff was featured in a program called "This is Ska!" alongside Prince Buster, Toots and the Maytals, and Byron Lee and the Dragonaires. 

He soon signed to Island Records and moved to the United Kingdom. Island Records initially (and unsuccessfully) tried to sell Cliff to the rock audience, but his career took off in the late 1960s. His international debut album was Hard Road to Travel, released in 1967. It received excellent reviews and included "Waterfall" (composed by Nirvana's Alex Spyropoulos and Patrick Campbell-Lyons), which became a hit in Brazil and won the International Song Festival.

"Waterfall" was followed in 1969 by "Wonderful World, Beautiful People" and "Vietnam" in 1970, both popular throughout most of the world. Bob Dylan called "Vietnam" the best protest song he had ever heard. Also during this period, Cliff released a cover of Cat Stevens' "Wild World" as a single, but it was not included on his Wonderful World, Beautiful People album.

In 1972, Cliff starred as Ivanhoe "Ivan" Martin in the classic reggae film, The Harder They Come, directed by Perry Henzell. As the film tells Martin's story, he is a young man without funds. Arriving in Kingston from the country, he tries to make it in the recording business, but without success. Eventually, he turns to a life of crime. The soundtrack album of the film was a huge success that sold well around the world, bringing reggae to an international audience for the first time. It remains one of the most internationally significant films to have come out of Jamaica since independence. The film made its debut at London's Gaumont cinema in Notting Hill on 1 September 1972. 

In 1975, Cliff sang on the first season of Saturday Night Live, episode 12, hosted by Dick Cavett. After a series of albums, Cliff took a break and traveled to Africa (the Nigeria-based Jamaican writer Lindsay Barrett was instrumental in Cliff's first trip there), and subsequently converted to Islam, taking the name of El Hadj Naïm Bachir.

1980s and 1990s
Cliff quickly returned to music, touring for several years before he recorded with Kool & the Gang. In 1984, Cliff appeared at the Pinkpop Festival in Landgraaf, Netherlands. During The River Tour, Bruce Springsteen and the E Street Band added Cliff's previously little-known song "Trapped" to their live set; it achieved great prominence when included on 1985's We Are the World benefit album. The follow-up, Cliff Hanger (1985), won a Grammy Award for 'Best Reggae Album', though it was his last major success in the United States until 1993. Also in 1985, Cliff contributed to the song "Sun City", a protest song written and composed by Steven Van Zandt and recorded by Artists United Against Apartheid to convey opposition to the South African policy of apartheid.

Cliff then provided backing vocals on The Rolling Stones' 1986 album Dirty Work, and appeared in the comedy Club Paradise, co-starring with Robin Williams and Peter O'Toole, and contributed several songs to the soundtrack, including "Seven Day Weekend", which he sang with Elvis Costello. In 1988, his song "Shelter of Your Love" was featured in the 1988 film Cocktail.

Cliff appeared in the film Marked for Death in 1990, performing "John Crow" with the Jimmy Cliff Band. His recording of "You Can Get It If You Really Want" was used as a campaign anthem by the Sandinista National Liberation Front in the 1990 election in Nicaragua. In 1991, he performed at the second Rock in Rio festival in Estádio do Maracanã in Rio de Janeiro, Brazil. He continued to sell well in Jamaica and, to a lesser extent, the UK, returning to the mainstream pop charts in the U.S. and elsewhere (#1 in France) with a version of Johnny Nash's "I Can See Clearly Now" on the Cool Runnings film soundtrack in 1993. In 1995, Cliff released the single "Hakuna Matata", a collaboration with Lebo M, a song from the soundtrack of the film The Lion King. In 1997, Cliff was a guest star in an episode of the Cartoon Network talk show Space Ghost Coast to Coast.

2000 to present
 
In 2001, Cliff became an inaugural member of the Independent Music Awards' judging panel to support independent artists. In 2002, Cliff released the album Fantastic Plastic People in Europe, after first providing free downloads using p2p software. This album featured collaborations with Joe Strummer, Annie Lennox, and Sting as well as new songs that were very reminiscent of Cliff's original hits. In 2004, Cliff completely reworked the songs, dropping the traditional reggae in favour of an electronic sound, for inclusion in Black Magic. The album also included a recording of "Over the Border" with Joe Strummer. Cliff performed at the closing ceremony to the 2002 Commonwealth Games and in 2003, his song "You Can Get It If You Really Want" was included in the soundtrack to the film, Something's Gotta Give. He also appeared in July 2003 at the Paléo Festival in Nyon, Switzerland. The Jamaican government under P. J. Patterson honoured Cliff on 20 October 2003, by awarding him The Order of Merit, the nation's fourth-highest honour, in recognition of his contributions to the film and music of Jamaica. Cliff and Mervyn Morris are the only currently living figures from the arts to hold this distinction and Cliff is the only living musician to do so.

In 2007, Cliff performed at the opening ceremony at cricket's World Cup. In the spring and summer of 2010, Cliff embarked on an extensive tour of the U.S. and Canada. In 2007, "You Can Get It If You Really Want" was adopted by the British Conservative Party during their annual conference. He was quoted in The Independent as saying, "One of my band mates called me this morning to tell me the news. I can't stop them using the song, but I'm not a supporter of politics. I have heard of Cameron, but I'm not a supporter. I don't support any politician. I just believe in right or wrong."

In September 2009, he was nominated for induction into the Rock and Roll Hall of Fame, following a campaign on his behalf by the American Charles Earle. Cliff reacted to the news by saying, "This is good for Cliff, good for Jamaican music and good for my country." On 15 December 2009, he was officially announced as an inductee and was inducted on 15 March 2010 by Wyclef Jean.

Cliff appeared in the 2011 documentary Reggae Got Soul: The Story of Toots and the Maytals which was featured on BBC and described as "The untold story of one of the most influential artists ever to come out of Jamaica".

In 2011, Cliff worked with producer Tim Armstrong, lead singer of American punk band Rancid, on the EP The Sacred Fire and the full-length album Rebirth. Rebirth won a Grammy Award for 'Best Reggae Album'. The album was listed at #12 on Rolling Stones list of the top 50 albums of 2012, saying "There's ska, rock steady, roots reggae, a revelatory cover of The Clash's "Guns of Brixton" delivered in Cliff's trademark soulful tenor, grittier but still lovely more than 40 years after his debut." 

In December 2012, Cliff was named 'Artist of the Year' by digital newspaper the Caribbean Journal, citing his work on Rebirth.

In August 2022, Cliff released the album Refugees.

Personal life
Cliff was briefly a member of the Rastafari movement before converting to Islam from Christianity. He now describes himself as having a "universal outlook on life", and does not align himself with any particular movement or religion, saying, "now I believe in science". He is married and has a daughter, Lilty Cliff, and a son, Aken Cliff. He is also the father of the actress/singer Nabiyah Be.

Discography

AlbumsNotes'''
A.  Hard Road to Travel was released as Can't Get Enough of It in Jamaica in 1968 with minor changes in track listing.
B.  Jimmy Cliff in Brazil consisted of new recordings as well as songs from Hard Road to Travel and Can't Get Enough of It.
C.  Jimmy Cliff was released as Wonderful World, Beautiful People in the US in 1970.
D.  Goodbye Yesterday was released as Two Worlds in Jamaica with minor changes in track listing.
E.  Unlimited was re-released as The King of Reggae in 1976.
F.  Struggling Man consisted of new recordings as well as songs from Wild World.
G.  Music Maker was released as House of Exile in some territories.
H.  Breakout was re-released as Samba Reggae in some territories in 1999 with minor changes in track listing.
I.  Higher & Higher consists of new recordings as well as previously released material.

Compilations and live albums

Notes
J.  Best of Jimmy Cliff and The Very Best of Jimmy Cliff & Peter Tosh'' charted in French Compilations Chart, at number 1 and 5 respectively.

Singles

See also
 Caribbean music in the United Kingdom
 List of converts to Islam
 List of former Island Records artists
 List of Jamaicans
 List of reggae musicians
 List of roots reggae artists
 List of singer-songwriters

References

External links
 
 
 
 

1944 births
Living people
20th-century Jamaican  male singers
21st-century Jamaican male singers
Converts to Islam from Christianity
Former Rastafarians
Grammy Award winners
Island Records artists
Jamaican expatriates in the United Kingdom
Jamaican former Christians
Jamaican former Muslims
Jamaican male actors
Jamaican reggae singers
People from Saint James Parish, Jamaica
Recipients of the Order of Merit (Jamaica)
Trojan Records artists